Judi St. Hilaire (born September 5, 1959) is an American former middle and long-distance runner. She won a silver medal at the 1985 World 15 km Road Race Championships and finished eighth in the 10,000 meters final at the 1992 Barcelona Olympics. She won the 1980 U.S. 10,000m title and the 1983 U.S. 5000m title.

International competitions

References

1959 births
Living people
American female long-distance runners
Track and field athletes from Vermont
Athletes (track and field) at the 1992 Summer Olympics
Olympic track and field athletes of the United States
American female marathon runners
World Athletics Championships athletes for the United States
21st-century American women